These are the full results of the athletics competition at the 2002 South American Games also serving as the 2002 South American Junior Championships in Athletics. The event took place between August 1 and August 3, 2002, at Estádio Olímpico do Pará in Belém, Brazil.

Differences between South American Games and South American Junior Championships
In contrast to the South American Junior Championships, there is a quorum for the South American Games: participation of at least 5 athletes from at least 3 countries is required.  If the quorum requirement is not met for an event, only one medal per country is awarded.  The following events were affected: no bronze medal in men's 3000m steeplechase, no bronze medal in women's discus throw, and no silver medal in women's javelin throw.

While the Olympic Committees of Aruba and the Netherlands Antilles (until dissolution) are affiöiated to ODESUR, their corresponding athletics federations (Arubaanse Atletiek Bond and Nederlands Antilliaanse Atletiek Unie) are affiliated to the North American, Central American and Caribbean Athletic Association rather than CONSUDATLE.  Their athletes compete at the South American Games, but not at the South American Junior Championships.  The performances of Churandy Martina in the finals winning the gold medal in men's 100 m and the silver medal in men's 200 m were reported.  Further details could not be retrieved.

Men's results

100 meters

Heat 1 – 1 August - Wind: +1.5 m/s

Heat 2 – 1 August - Wind: +1.3 m/s

Final – 1 August - Wind: +0.8 m/s

200 meters

Heat 1 – 3 August - Wind: +2.6 m/s

Heat 2 – 3 August - Wind: +1.8 m/s

Final – 3 August - Wind: +1.1 m/s

400 meters

Heat 1 – 1 August

Heat 2 – 1 August

Final – 1 August

800 meters
Final – 2 August

1500 meters
Final – 3 August

5000 meters
Final – 1 August

10,000 meters
Final – 3 August

3000 meters steeplechase
Final – 2 August

110 meters hurdles
Final – 3 August - Wind: +1.5 m/s

400 meters hurdles

Heat 1 – 2 August

Heat 2 – 2 August

Final – 2 August

High jump
Final – 2 August

Pole vault
Final – 3 August

Long jump
Final – 2 August

Triple jump
Final – 3 August

Shot put
Final – 1 August
6 kg Junior implement

Discus throw
Final – 2 August
1.750 kg Junior implement

Hammer throw
Final – 3 August
6 kg Junior implement

Javelin throw
Final – 1 August

Decathlon
Final
Junior implements (1995-2005)

10,000 meters walk
Final – 2 August

4x100 meters relay
Final – 2 August

4x400 meters relay
Final – 3 August

Women's results

100 meters
Final – 1 August - Wind: +1.3 m/s

200 meters

Heat 1 – 3 August

Heat 2 – 3 August

Final – 3 August - Wind: +1.7 m/s

400 meters
Final – 1 August

800 meters
Final – 2 August

1500 meters
Final – 3 August

†: Eliane Pereira ranked initially 1st (4:33.19), but was disqualified later for infringement of IAAF doping rules.

3000 meters
Final – 1 August

†: Eliane Pereira ranked initially 2nd (9:52.42), but was disqualified later for infringement of IAAF doping rules.

5000 meters
Final – 2 August

3000 meters steeplechase
Final – 3 August

100 meters hurdles
Final – 3 August - Wind: -0.9 m/s

400 meters hurdles
Final – 2 August

High jump
Final – 1 August

Pole vault
Final – 2 August

Long jump
Final – 2 August

Triple jump
Final – 1 August

Shot put
Final – 2 August

Discus throw
Final – 3 August

Hammer throw
Final – 1 August

Javelin throw
Final – 2 August

Heptathlon
Final

10,000 meters walk
Final – 2 August

4x100 meters relay
Final – 2 August

4x400 meters relay
Final – 3 August

Note
It is reported that two further doping cases with enhanced Testosterone/Epitestosterone ratio were discovered (no medalists involved). Further details could not be retrieved.

References

2002
South American Under-23 Championships in Athletics
South American Games
2002 in youth sport
Athl